Amanimalel (also Amanimalēl and Amanimalil) was a Kushite queen of the Napatan kingdom of Nubia, likely a spouse of king Senkamanisken living in the second half of the 7th century BC. She is mostly known from one or possibly two statues of her of very high quality.

Chronology and family
Amanimalel lived in the second half of the 7th century BC. Several date have been proposed for her queenship based on those estimated for Senkamanisken's rule: 643–623 BC, or 642–623 BC.

Amanimalel is presumed to have been a queen consort of Senkamanisken, who was also married to queen Nasalsa and, possibly, Masalaye. As such, Amanimalel could be the mother of queens Asata and Madekan who espoused kings Aspelta and Anlamani, respectively.  These possibilities are debated however because of the lack of direct evidence on the matter. Amanimalel's parents are equally uncertain, she could be a daughter of Atlanersa.

Attestations

The statue, one of the great masterpieces of African art, shows the queen in a traditionally Egyptian striding pose, wearing a Nubian variation of an Egyptian dress that could have been sheathed in silver while the feet may have been adorned with golden sandals. The back pillar of the statue states that she is "beloved of Amun of Napata who resides in the sacred mountain", showing that the queen participated in the cult of Amun at Napata in a role that might have been related with that of God's Wife of Amun of the preceding Twenty-Fifth Dynasty. The inscription was under the aegis of a goddess whose portrait is damaged but may belong to Mut. The queen is shown holding a smaller statue of a god child wearing the double crown who might well be Khonsu, a son of Amun at Thebes, thereby associating the queen closely with the triad Amun, Mut and Khonsu.

A second, very similar, quartzite statue is located at the Neues Museum of Berlin and is thought to belong to Amanimalel owing to the close resemblance between both representations.

Tomb
The tomb of queen Amanimalel has not been identified with any certainty. Reisner proposed that pyramid 22 at the royal necropolis of Nuri belongs to her. The pyramid was excavated in 1917. These works unearthed fragments of gold foil, small silver artefacts and beads.

References and sources

References

Sources

 

7th-century BC women
Queens of Kush
7th-century BC Egyptian people